The 2022–23 Mount St. Mary's Mountaineers men's basketball team represented Mount St. Mary's University in the 2022–23 NCAA Division I men's basketball season. The Mountaineers, led by fifth-year head coach Dan Engelstad, played their home games at Knott Arena in Emmitsburg, Maryland as first-year members of the Metro Atlantic Athletic Conference.

Previous season
The Mountaineers finished the 2021–22 season 14–16, 9–9 in NEC play to finish in fifth place. In the NEC tournament, they defeated St. Francis Brooklyn in the quarterfinals, before falling to top-seeded and eventual champion Bryant in the semifinals. This was their last season as members of the Northeast Conference, as they moved to the Metro Atlantic Athletic Conference starting in the 2022–23 season.

Roster

Schedule and results

|-
!colspan=12 style=| Regular season

|-
!colspan=12 style=| MAAC tournament

Sources

References

Mount St. Mary's Mountaineers men's basketball seasons
Mount St. Mary's Mountaineers
Mount St. Mary's Mountaineers men's basketball team
Mount St. Mary's Mountaineers men's basketball team